This is a partial list of dinosaur finds in the United Kingdom, arranged by genus alphabetically.

List of dinosaurs

Timeline 
This is a timeline for these dinosaurs during the Mesozoic era. Time is measured in millions of years. Red for carnivores, blue for omnivores, green for herbivores.

See also 
 Dinosaurs of the Isle of Wight
 List of European dinosaurs

External links 

 Paleobiology Database Navigator

References 

Dinosaur-related lists
Dinosaurs of Europe